The Truth About Markets: Why Some Nations are Rich but Most Remain Poor is a book by economist John Kay, published in 2003 by Allen Lane.

Plot
The Truth About Markets looks at why market economies performed better than socialist or centrally directed ones. The book looks at markets in a number of different settings around the world.

References

External links
 Author's website

Books about capitalism
2003 non-fiction books